Zhang Liang (born 14 January 1987) is a male Chinese rower who competed for Team China at the 2008 Summer Olympics and the 2012 Summer Olympics.

Zhang gained international notoriety when he failed to show up for the men's single sculls at the 2008 Olympics and was therefore also disqualified from the doubles event in line with international rowing rules.

At the 2012 Summer Olympics, he only competed in the single sculls, finishing 11th.

In the 2019 and 2021 World Rowing Championships, Zhang competed with Liu Zhiyu taking gold in the men's double sculls event.

Major performances
2007 World Cup Amsterdam – 8th single sculls
2019 World Rowing Championships Ottensheim - 1st double sculls
2021 World Rowing Championships Lucerne - 1st double sculls

References

External links

1987 births
Living people
Chinese male rowers
Olympic rowers of China
Rowers at the 2012 Summer Olympics
Rowers at the 2020 Summer Olympics
People from Jinzhou
Asian Games medalists in rowing
Rowers from Liaoning
Rowers at the 2010 Asian Games
Rowers at the 2014 Asian Games
Rowers at the 2018 Asian Games
Asian Games gold medalists for China
Medalists at the 2010 Asian Games
Medalists at the 2014 Asian Games
Medalists at the 2018 Asian Games
World Rowing Championships medalists for China
Medalists at the 2020 Summer Olympics
Olympic medalists in rowing
Olympic bronze medalists for China
20th-century Chinese people
21st-century Chinese people